William Dawe (8 April 1825 – 12 August 1912) was a New Zealand cricketer. He played in one first-class match for Canterbury in 1865/66.

See also
 List of Canterbury representative cricketers

References

External links
 

1825 births
1912 deaths
New Zealand cricketers
Canterbury cricketers
People from Sherborne
Cricketers from Dorset